Tineg, officially the Municipality of Tineg, is a 2nd class municipality in the province of Abra, Philippines. According to the 2020 census, it has a population of 4,977 people.

History

On October 29, 2002, Mayor Clarence Benwaren was assassinated by a gunman named Edberto Jamoncio while he was attending a wedding ceremony in Calauan, Laguna.

Geography

According to the Philippine Statistics Authority, the municipality has a land area of  constituting  of the  total area of Abra. Tineg boundaries will be province of the Apayao to the northeast and province of the Ilocos Norte to the north and northwest.

Climate

The climate is characterized by 2 distinct seasons. The dry season which occurs from November to April, is marked by daily blue skies and clear starry nights and the wet season for the rest of the year with high rainfall intensities accompanied by storms and typhoons.

Barangays
Tineg is politically subdivided into 10 barangays. These barangays are headed by elected officials: Barangay Captain, Barangay Council, whose members are called Barangay Councilors. All are elected every three years.

Demographics

In the 2020 census, Tineg had a population of 4,977.

Economy

Government
Tineg, belonging to the lone congressional district of the province of Abra, is governed by a mayor designated as its local chief executive and by a municipal council as its legislative body in accordance with the Local Government Code. The mayor, vice mayor, and the councilors are elected directly by the people through an election which is being held every three years.

Elected officials

Attractions

There are several waterfalls in Tineg, which include the Cabato Falls, Guirem Falls, and Anito Falls.

In Tineg, cottage industries are predominant: such as bamboo and rattan crafts. It also has a number of forest resources such as wood, bamboos (like buho, bayog, and hiling), pine, rattan, and tiger grass.

References

External links

 [ Philippine Standard Geographic Code]
 Municipality of Tineg

Municipalities of Abra (province)